Janis Nuckolls is an American anthropological linguist and professor of linguistics and English language at Brigham Young University in Provo, Utah. She spent many years doing field research with a primary focus on the Amazonian Quichua (Kichwa) people in Amazonian Ecuador and their endangered language.

Nuckolls earned her B.A. from the University of Wisconsin and her A.M. and Ph.D. from the University of Chicago. After first visiting the Amazon in graduate school, Nuckolls has returned for field research for more than 30 years.

Research
Quechua, considered an endangered language, is spoken by between 10,000 and 40,000 people. Nuckolls has published extensively on the sound-symbolic grammar, performance, and cognition in Pastaza Quechua. Her interest includes studying the functions of ideophones, which are words that offer a vivid sensory impression through sound, movement, shape, or action. Nuckolls described it "as painting a word picture–even though they are words, they function as images which communicate not only with sounds but with gestures as well". She has published, among other places, in the Journal of Linguistic Anthropology, Language in Society, Semiotica, the Annual Review of Anthropology, Latin American Indian Literatures, the Journal of Latin American Lore, Anthropological Linguistics, American Anthropologist, and Philosophical Psychology.

Believing ideophones to be best recorded in video format, to capture their performative multi-modal nature, she set up the Quechua Real Words 'audio-visual dictionary' of Amazonian Quichua (formerly also written as Quechua, but now written as Quichua and Kichwa in Ecuador) ideophones, largely from Pastaza Quichua: https://quechuarealwords.byu.edu/

As Professor Nuckolls herself put it on the website: 'Quechua Real Words is a site dedicated to an appreciation and study of real words that, by their nature, are difficult to define within a traditional dictionary format. Such words, called ‘ideophones’, ‘mimetics’, ‘expressives’, and ‘onomatopoeias’ by linguists, present many problems for analysis because of their melodic and gestural dimensions. They are not designed to be abstracted onto a 2 dimensional page and are therefore presented here with audiovisual clips of their use.'

Personal life
She is married and they have one son and two daughters. She is a member of the Church of Jesus Christ of Latter-day Saints.

Bibliography
Sounds Like Life: Sound-Symbolic Grammar, Performance, and Cognition in Pastaza Quechua (Oxford University Press, 1996)
Lessons from a Quechua Strongwoman: Ideophony, Dialogue, and Perspective (University of Arizona Press, 2010)

References

External links
 BYU Linguistics & English Language

University of Chicago alumni
University of Wisconsin–Madison alumni
Living people
Linguists from the United States
Sociolinguists
Brigham Young University faculty
Women linguists
Communication scholars
American Latter Day Saints
Year of birth missing (living people)